The 1897 Grand National was the 59th renewal of the Grand National horse race that took place at Aintree near Liverpool, England, on 26 March 1897.

Finishing Order

Non-finishers

References

 1897
Grand National
Grand National
19th century in Lancashire
Grand National